Hesperoxiphion is a genus of flowering plants in the family Iridaceae, first described as a genus in 1877. It is native to northwestern South America. The genus name is derived from the Greek words hesperos, meaning "western", and xiphos, meaning "sword".

 Species
 Hesperoxiphion herrerae (Diels ex R.C.Foster) Ravenna - Cajamarca region in Peru
 Hesperoxiphion huilense Ravenna - Colombia
 Hesperoxiphion niveum (Ravenna) Ravenna - Cajamarca region in Peru
 Hesperoxiphion pardalis (Ravenna) Ravenna - Apurímac region in Peru
 Hesperoxiphion peruvianum (Baker) Baker - Bolivia, Peru

References

Iridaceae
Iridaceae genera
Flora of South America
Taxa named by John Gilbert Baker